George Gilbert Scott (1811–78) was an English architect.

Lists of his works can be found at:

 List of new churches by George Gilbert Scott in the East of England
 List of new churches by George Gilbert Scott in the English Midlands
 List of new churches by George Gilbert Scott in London
 List of new churches by George Gilbert Scott in Northern England
 List of new churches by George Gilbert Scott in South East England
 List of new churches by George Gilbert Scott in South West England

George Gilbert Scott buildings and structures
Scott, George Gilbert